Halonen Cave is a cave in Säkkilä village, Halosenvaara, Kuusamo, Finland. The cave forms a passageway that expands into a room-like space, and in which the tilt of the floor grows towards the back of the cave. The cave is shaped like a cylinder, and is almost round. It is over 15 meters long, and its height at the middle is approximately 3 meters, and received its name from one of its landowners.

References

Caves of Finland
Kuusamo